Stericycle is a compliance company that specializes in collecting and disposing regulated substances, such as medical waste and sharps, pharmaceuticals, hazardous waste, and providing services for recalled and expired goods. It also provides related education and training services, and patient communication services. The company was founded in 1989 and is headquartered in Bannockburn, Illinois, with many more bases of operation around the world, including Medical waste incinerators in Utah and North Carolina.

Overview
Stericycle, Inc., together with its subsidiaries, offers regulated waste management services, sharps disposal containers to reduce the risk of needlesticks, healthcare compliance services, pharmaceutical disposal, and regulated returns management services for expired or recalled products through incineration processes. In addition, with the acquisition of Shred-it in 2015, Stericycle also offers secure information destruction services including document and hard drive destruction.

The company serves healthcare facilities such as hospitals, blood banks, pharmaceutical manufacturers,. Stericycle also serves myriad small businesses, which include outpatient clinics, medical and dental offices, abortion clinics, veterinary and animal hospitals, funeral homes, home healthcare agencies, body art studios, and long-term and sub-acute care facilities. Medical device manufacturers, consumer goods manufacturers, and retailers are also key customers.

Stericycle has been harshly criticized by residents living near their incinerators and environmentalists across the globe. Currently, Stericycle is being investigated by the state of Utah for burning hazardous, radioactive waste above legal levels at their North Salt Lake location. The investigations also are in response to Stericycle's alleged falsification of records to hide the alleged illegal quantity burning near Foxboro Elementary in North Salt Lake.

International operations
Stericycle has a presence in 21 countries with approximately 640 locations worldwide. Approximately 20% of the company's revenue comes from its international operations. Full services are offered the U.S., Canada, Ireland, the Netherlands, and Spain. Stericycle offers all services, except for hazardous waste management, in the United Kingdom. Only regulated waste operations are in Argentina, Brazil, Chile, Japan, Mexico, Portugal, South Korea, and Romania. Only secure information destruction services are provided in Australia, Austria, Belgium, France, Germany, Luxembourg, and Singapore. Secure information destruction services under the Shred-it brand are also provided in the United Arab Emirates through a joint venture with the company's portion of income reported as an equity investment.

Leadership
Cindy Miller joined Stericycle in October 2018 as President and Chief Operating Officer, and became Chief Executive Officer in May 2019. She was preceded in her role by Charlie Alutto, and prior to that, by Mark Miller, who took over from founder Dr. James Sharp in 1989. Stericycle has been publicly traded on the NASDAQ since 1996 and has 10 people on its board of directors.

History
Stericycle was founded in 1989 by Dr. James Sharp based on his business plan to address the Syringe Tide, where hypodermic needles and other medical waste washed up to the shores of New York and New Jersey. The Syringe Tide led to the Medical Waste Tracking Act, signed in 1988, establishing regulated medical waste management as an industry.

In 1992, Mark Miller stepped in as President and CEO, and as a result of Miller's leadership, Stericycle grew rapidly, going public in 1996 on the NASDAQ (ticker SRCL). Stericycle began to expand internationally in 1998, starting with Mexico and Canada. (4) In 1999, Stericycle acquired 200,000 customers from Allied Waste Industries after Allied acquired Browning Ferris Industries.

The company's international business began in 1997 with a joint venture in Mexico. Since then, Stericycle has created services, tools and resources for healthcare professionals not only in the United States and Mexico, but also in Argentina, Brazil, Canada, Chile, Ireland, Japan, Portugal, Puerto Rico, Romania, Spain, and the United Kingdom.

In 1999, Stericycle began offering safety and compliance training services with the launch of its Stericycle Steri-Safe OSHA Compliance program.

Expansion
In the 2000s, Stericycle achieved growth through launching and/or acquiring complementary business lines, as well as continued international expansion. In 2003, Stericycle entered sharps waste management, acquiring Scherer Healthcare's existing practice and occasionally referring to parts of the service as  “Bio Systems” in markets like Ireland.  In 2004, Stericycle began providing medical waste solutions in the United Kingdom with more international growth following. In 2008, Stericycle acquired its first hazardous waste removal company and in 2010 started its Communications Solutions business line. The acquisition of PSC Environmental Solutions in 2014 led to the formal establishment of Environmental Solutions focused on hazardous waste. Finally, Stericycle's largest acquisition to date, Shred-it, occurred in 2015, for US$2.3 billion.

In 2010, Stericycle began to include patient notification services with the acquisition of NotifyMD. Several other acquisitions followed, giving Stericycle an interest in telephone support services for physician offices.

In 2014, it acquired PSC Environmental Services LLC in a deal worth $275 million to form Stericycle Environmental Solutions. This enabled expansion in hazardous waste management.

In 2015, it acquired Shred-it International in a deal worth $2.3 billion.

The company lost a contract to provide clinical waste services to GPs and pharmacies in Cumbria and north-east England in April 2017, when their competitor, Healthcare Environment Services put in a substantially cheaper offer, of £310,000, than theirs of £479,999. Stericycle then contrived a legal challenge against NHS England’s decision which was dismissed by the High Court of Justice in July 2018, and the company's behaviour severely criticised. Their commercial director Lindsay Dransfield was described as  “a broadly unsatisfactory witness”. The company said it intended to appeal.

Beyond services related to healthcare wastes, in some markets the company has expanded its offerings to include management of certain hazardous wastes as well as patient transport and medical courier services.

In October 2018, Cindy Miller became president and Chief Operating Officer of Stericycle, and became Chief Executive Officer in May 2019.

Services
Stericycle offers the following types of specialized waste management:
Regulated medical waste management
Hazardous waste management
Sharps waste management 
Pharmaceutical waste or environmentally persistent pharmaceutical pollutants
Drug disposal
Integrated Waste Stream services – coordinating multiple waste streams for one entity

Stericycle offers secure information destruction, for both paper and hard drive, through Shred-it.

The company also offers compliance training primarily through online courses focused on applying industry regulations related to information security, human resources, medical billing, and patient communications. They have also developed training software related to compliance. Additionally, they have a communications team that coordinates call centers in emergencies and assists with waste management messaging.

UK
The company has a contract for collection and disposal services to around 700 GP practices across Hampshire and Isle of Wight, Buckinghamshire, Surrey, Sussex, Oxfordshire and Berkshire and acute NHS trusts in England.  In 2020 it suffered from capacity problems and failed to collect clinical waste routinely from 139 practices during September and October. 245 collections were missed.  They said that the NHS was producing significantly higher volumes of clinical waste than expected because of the amount of Personal protective equipment being used.

Community involvement
Opioid crisis
In 2018, Stericycle joined the National Safety Council as the medicine disposal partner for a nationwide campaign. Stericycle served as a leading voice on safe disposal practices giving away thousands of Seal&SendSM MailBack Envelopes consumers could drop in any mailbox.

The Stop Everyday Killers campaign began with the unveiling of Prescribed to Death: A Memorial to the Victims of the Opioid Crisis in Chicago. The exhibit includes a memorial wall made of pills carved with faces that represent the 22,000 people lost last year to prescription opioid overdose.

In 2019, Stericycle partnered with the National Safety Council to launch the Opioids at Work Employer Toolkit.

SteriCares Hardship Fund
Stericycle operates a fund that allows employees to support other employees in times of hardship. Stericycle employees have helped over 250 Stericycle families with over $515,000 in grants since 2016. During the fund's biggest year ever in 2017, employees raised $160,000 alone in emergency relief following Hurricane Harvey, Hurricane Irma, and Hurricane Maria. The company currently operates the fund in the US and Canada, and plans to expand it to Latin America in 2019.

After Hurricane Harvey hit Houston in 2017, Stericycle team members amassed three truckloads of donations that were distributed to families across five Stericycle sites in Houston. After Hurricane Maria, Stericycle facilities in Puerto Rico became gathering zones for hot meals, water, laundry service, showers, and shelter to team members who lost their homes.

Global food aid
Since 2011, Stericycle has supported Feed My Starving Children, an organization benefiting malnourished children around the world. In 2018, Stericycle team members packed over 291 cases totaling nearly 63,000 meals, which will feed over 170 children.

American Diabetes Association partnership
Stericycle has also partnered with the American Diabetes Association (ADA) in 2019. Stericycle's partnership with the ADA includes providing consumer-based education, raising awareness and sponsoring key events, such as the Tour de Cure.

Controversy

Pollution violation settlement
In 2011, the Texas Commission on Environmental Quality alleged Stericycle "failed to dispose of pathological waste according to approved methods of treatment and disposition" in violation of 30 Tex. Admin. Code § 330.1219(b)(3). Stericycle denied the charges but agreed to a settlement that included a fine of $34,000.

Environmental concerns
Stericycle's medical waste incinerator located in North Salt Lake, Utah has been a topic of hot debate in the community. In September 2013, Erin Brockovich joined in with Utah residents in their call for Stericycle to discontinue their business in the area. Brockovich's visit was spurred by a violation notice from the Utah Division of Air Quality to Stericycle for excessive emissions above legal limits, and manipulating their reporting to show lower amounts of Mercury, Dioxins, and other potentially harmful chemicals emitted through burning medical waste.

The violations in 2013 were followed by criminal investigations at the order of Utah Governor Gary Herbert. 
Investigations by California's Soil Water Air Protection Enterprise, or SWAPE, in connection with Ms. Brockovich, discovered Dioxin in homes near the incinerator at levels 16x higher than what is considered "safe".

As of December 1, 2014, Stericycle and the Utah Division of Air Quality reached an agreement acknowledging no wrongdoing, though the settlement does require Stericycle to relocate approximately 40 miles to the west of the incinerator's current location in North Salt Lake. The settlement also calls for Stericycle to pay a $2.3 million fine, half of which is forgivable if the move happens within 3 years.

As of October 2017, a  $295 million settlement was reached on behalf of a nationwide class of Stericycle customers, following a class-action lawsuit accusing the company of engaging in a price-increasing scheme that automatically inflated customers' bills up to 18 percent biannually, according to a news release from Hagens Berman, the Chicago-based law firm that represented the class.

See also 
 Shred-it

References

External links

American companies established in 1989
Companies listed on the Nasdaq
Companies based in Lake Forest, Illinois
Medical waste
Waste management companies of the United States
1996 initial public offerings
Waste companies established in 1989